Sajad was a Palestinian village in the Ramle Subdistrict. It was located sixteen kilometers south of Ramla. It was depopulated during the 1948 Arab–Israeli war.

History
In 1838, Sejad  was noted as a place "in ruins or deserted."

The village of Sajad was the site of a railway station built by the French in Ottoman era Palestine. In August 1892, the Jaffa–Jerusalem railway service was initiated; the train stopped in Sajad. The station was closed after a new railway line and station were built at nearby Wadi Sarar in 1915.

The land which the villagers cultivated, was at one time owned by the Ottoman sultan Abd al-Hamid, but it was taken from him by the Ottoman government in 1908. After this, the village land was classified as jiftlik land, owned by the government but leased on a long-term basis to the villagers.

British Mandate era
In the 1922 census of Palestine, conducted by the British Mandate authorities, Sajad had a population of 221 Muslims, increasing in the 1931 census to 300, still all Muslims, in a total of 66 houses.

The village did not have a school on its own, but in 1945–46 it started sending its students to a school in Qazaza, a village to the southeast.

In the 1945 statistics the population was 370, all Muslims, while the total land area was 2,795 dunams, according to an official land and population survey. Of this, a total of 1,687 dunums of land were used for cereals, while 19 dunams were classified as built-up public areas.

1948 and after
A military operation planned by the pre-state Israeli forces against the village of Sajad as part of Operation Nahshon is recorded in a document from the Nahshon Headquarters to the 52nd Battalion, dated 15 April 1948. According to Benny Morris, "Battalion 3 was ordered to annihilate and destroy the village of Sajad." According to Khalidi the village was taken on 9–10 July as part of the Givati Brigade's Operation An-Far.

There are Palestinian refugees from Sajad who still long to return to the site of their former village and who express deep distrust of other Arab countries in which they live as refugees. . For example, Hassan, a refugee living in the Marka camp in Jordan stated: "We do not have any confidence in the Arabs and they are traitors, sometimes I get so depressed about it, I do not even want to talk to my children about what happened to my village Sajad in Palestine ... I prefer to live in a tent in my homeland than a castle anywhere else ... because I will always feel that the castle is not really mine."

According to Walid Khalidi, the site of the former village of Sajad is inaccessible, as it is now a military zone in Israel.

See also
Depopulated Palestinian locations in Israel

References

Bibliography

External links
Welcome To Sajad
Sajad, Zochrot
Survey of Western Palestine, Map 16:   IAA, Wikimedia commons
Sajad at Khalil Sakakini Cultural Center

District of Ramla
Arab villages depopulated during the 1948 Arab–Israeli War